Luis López de Mesa Gómez (October12, 1884October18, 1967) was a Colombian medical doctor, Harvard psychiatrist, Dean of the National University of Colombia, Minister of National Education, and Minister of Foreign Affairs.

Works
 El libro de los apólogos (1918)
 La biografía de Gloria Etzel (1921)
 El factor étnico (1927)
 Civilización contemporánea (1926)
 La tragedia de Nilse (novela, 1928)
 Biografía de Gloria Etzel (novela, 1929)
 Introducción a la historia de la cultura en Colombia (1930)
 Cómo se ha formado la Nación colombiana (1934)
 Disertación sociológica(1939)
 Miguel Antonio Caro y Rufino José Cuervo (1944)
 Nosotros y la Esfinge (1947)
 Perspectivas culturales (1949)
 Escrutinio sociológico de la historia colombiana (1955)
 Escrutinio sociológico de la historia colombiana (1956)
 Rudimentos de onomatología (1960)
 Oraciones panegíricas (1964).

1884 births
1967 deaths
People from Antioquia Department
Colombian male writers
Colombian psychiatrists
Foreign ministers of Colombia
Colombian Ministers of National Education
Members of the Chamber of Representatives of Colombia